Humberto Soto (born 21 January 1980) is a Mexican professional boxer who held the WBC FECOMBOX heavyweight title in 2008.

Professional career
On August 30, 2008 Soto knocked out the veteran Carlos Sandoval to win the WBC FECOMBOX heavyweight title. This bout was held at the Expo Forum in Hermosillo, Sonora, Mexico.

References

External links

Boxers from Sonora
Sportspeople from Hermosillo
Heavyweight boxers
1980 births
Living people
Mexican male boxers
21st-century Mexican people